Inuit art, also known as Eskimo art, refers to artwork produced by Inuit, that is, the people of the Arctic previously known as Eskimos, a term that is now often considered offensive. Historically, their preferred medium was walrus ivory, but since the establishment of southern markets for Inuit art in 1945, prints and figurative works carved in relatively soft stone such as soapstone, serpentinite, or argillite have also become popular.

The Winnipeg Art Gallery has the largest public collection of contemporary Inuit art in the world. In 2007, the Museum of Inuit Art opened in Toronto, but closed due to lack of resources in 2016.

History

Pre-Dorset and Dorset cultures

Around 4000 BCE nomads known as the Pre-Dorset or the Arctic small tool tradition (ASTT) crossed over the Bering Strait from Siberia into Alaska, the Canadian Arctic, Greenland, and Labrador. Very little remains of them, and only a few preserved artifacts carved in ivory could be considered works of art. The Dorset culture, which became culturally distinct around 600 BCE, produced a significant amount of figurative art in the mediums of walrus ivory, bone, caribou antler, and on rare occasion stone. Subjects included birds, bears, walruses, seals, and human figures, as well as remarkably small masks. The Dorsets depicted bears and other animals in ivory with lines indicating their skeletal system incised on the surface of the ivory; bears in such a style are known as "flying bears". These items had a magical or religious significance, and were either worn as amulets to ward off evil spirits, or used in the Inuit religion.

Ipiutak culture
The Ipiutak culture seems to represent a classical period of Inuit development. The artwork is extremely elaborate, incorporating geometric, animal, and anthropomorphic designs.

Thule culture
Around 1000 CE, the people of the Thule culture, ancestors of today's Inuit, migrated from northern Alaska and either displaced or slaughtered the earlier Dorset inhabitants. Thule art had a definite Alaskan influence, and included utilitarian objects such as combs, buttons, needle cases, cooking pots, ornate spears and harpoons. The graphic decorations incised on them were purely ornamental, bearing no religious significance, but to make the objects used in everyday life appealing.

All Inuit utensils, tools and weapons were made by hand from natural materials: stone, bone, ivory, antler, and animal hides. Nomadic people could take very little else with them besides the tools of their daily living; non-utilitarian objects were also carved in miniature so that they could be carried around or worn, such as delicate earrings, dance masks, amulets, fetish figures, and intricate combs and figures which were used to tell legends and objectify their religion and oral history.

16th century

In the 16th century Inuit began to barter with European whalers, missionaries and other visitors to the North for tea, weapons or alcohol. Items previously produced as decorative tools or amulets for the angakkuq (shaman), such as carvings of animals and hunting or camping scenes, became trade commodities. Inuit artists also began producing ivory miniatures specifically as trade goods, to decorate European rifles, tools, boats, and musical instruments. Cribbage boards and carved walrus and narwhal tusks were intended for the whalers. Missionaries encouraged the use of Christian imagery, which was accepted to a limited extent.

Since 1945
Traditionally, Inuit carved objects for decoration, use in games, religious purposes, or self-amusement. However the nature and functions of Inuit carvings changed rapidly after contact with European and European-Canadian society. This change accelerated after around 1949, when Inuit began settling into communities, and the Canadian government began to encourage a carving industry as a source of income for the Inuit. The art changed markedly from the form which prevailed in the past, in size, media, motif, and style.

The Government of Canada's encouragement of commercial carving was initially heavy-handed, as is most clearly shown by the pamphlet "Eskimo Handicrafts", circulated among Inuit communities in the early 1950s. Intended to provide inspiration to Inuit sculptors, this pamphlet depicted artifacts in the collection of the Canadian Museum of Civilization; many of the objects pictured, such as totem poles, were not germane to Inuit culture.

The first generation of Inuit artists in Kinngait (formerly Cape Dorset) in the 1940s and 1950s sold their carvings to the Baffin Trading Company (1939–1946) and the Hudson's Bay Company. The West Baffin Eskimo Cooperative was founded in Kinngait in 1959 and became the primary purchaser of arts and craft items.

Types

Block printing
James Archibald Houston, who had helped attract the attention of the Canadian Handicrafts Guild to Inuit carving in the late 1940s, travelled to Kinngait, then called Cape Dorset on Baffin Island in 1951 and introduced printmaking to the artists' repertoire there. Figures of animals and hunters, family scenes, and mythological imagery became popular. By the 1960s, co-operatives were set up in most Inuit communities, and the Inuit art market began to flourish.

From 2018 to 2019, the University of Michigan Museum of Art exhibited Inuit block prints, in an exhibitions called The Power Family Program for Inuit Art: Tillirnanngittuq (curated by Marion "Mame" Jackson, in collaboration with Pat Feheley). Tillirnannqittuq means "unexpected" in Inuktitut, and the show featured Kenojuak Ashevak, Lucy Qinnuayuak, Niviaksiak, Osuitok Ipeelee, Kananginak Pootoogook, and Johnny Inukpuk.

Since the early 1950s, when Inuit graphic styles such as stenciling and block printing were being developed, some Inuit artists have adopted a polished style rooted in naturalism. Other artists, such as John Pangnark, have developed a style that is highly abstract. Both styles are generally used to depict traditional beliefs or animals.

Stone is a common choice for block printing, but its availability and the fact that the printmakers were often carvers familiar with the stone made it a good choice. During the mid-1980s one of the printmakers, Iyola, who owned a pool hall, experimented with slate made for pool tables and since that time this type of slate has been used for printmaking. Prior to that, stone from the region including steatite and talc stone were used.

The final print is a collaboration between the printer/stone carver and the artist. The printer makes some artistic decisions regarding the final product.  For example, if the original drawing has a lot of thin lines or intricacies, the printer/carver must alter the drawing in order to make it possible to carve it into stone.  Specific aspects of the drawing may be altered in order to fit onto the stone. In one instance the neck of a duck had to be shortened, in another only a portion of the artist's original drawing was selected for reproduction.

Drawing 
Before the arrival of James Houston to the Arctic in the late 1940s, the Inuit did not have a tradition of drawing images on paper. Artists produced drawings and sold them to the local co-operative or print studio, which would determine the selection of images that would be made into prints. Houston encouraged artists to depict the traditional Inuit way of life in their drawings. Kinngait-based Pitseolak Ashoona was one of the first Inuit artists to explicitly include autobiographical content in her works. She had an important artistic influence on her granddaughter, Annie Pootoogook, who, through her vivid drawings of everyday life in the North, played a pivotal role in establishing Inuit art as a contemporary art form.

Fashion 

Inuit clothing has long been a means of artistic expression for Inuit seamstresses, who historically employed decorative techniques like ornamental trim and inlay, dye and other colouring methods, decorative attachments like pendants and beadwork, and design motifs, integrating and adapting new techniques and materials as they were introduced by cultural contact. 

Modern Inuit fashion is a subset of the wider Indigenous American fashion movement. Contemporary Inuit and northern designers use a mix of contemporary and traditional materials to create garments in both traditional and modern silhouettes. Many designers also make jewellery from local or sustainable materials such as bone. The work of fashion designer Victoria Kakuktinniq, who focuses on parkas with traditional styling, has been cited as a major influence in the modernization of Inuit fashion. Some designers center aspects of Inuit culture through the visual design of their products, including prints with traditional tools, contemporary northern food products, and  geometric designs that originated with traditional Inuit tattooing.

Sculpture

Inuit sculptures had been produced prior to contact with the Western world. They were small-scale and made of ivory. In 1951, James Houston encouraged Inuit in Kinngait to produce stone carvings. It was mostly men who took up carving. Oviloo Tunnillie was one of the few women to work in sculpture and to garner a national reputation. Today, Inuit continue to carve pieces entirely by hand. Power tools are occasionally used, but most artists prefer to use an axe and file, as this gives them more control over the stone. The final stage of carving is the polishing, which is done with several grades of waterproof sandpaper, and hours and hours of rubbing. The most common material is now soapstone, serpentine, either deposits from the Arctic, which range from black to light green in colour, or orange-red imports from Brazil. Other material used in Inuit sculptures include, caribou antlers, ivory from marine mammals, and the bone of various animals.

Inuit Art Society
The Inuit Art Society, of which most members are in the Midwestern United States, was established in 2003. Their mission is "To provide education about and support for the culture, art forms, and artists of the Arctic." There are approximately 100 dues-paying members. Their two-day annual meetings "include native Inuit artists from Canada, knowledgeable speakers about Inuit art and culture, a Marketplace where Inuit art can be purchased, and ample time to meet or reconnect with attendees. Most meetings also include a tour of a private collection near the meeting site and/or an opportunity for a private tour of a public collection."

Notable Inuit artists

 Manasie Akpaliapik
 Germaine Arnaktauyok
 Aron of Kangeq
 Karoo Ashevak
 Kenojuak Ashevak
 Pitseolak Ashoona
 Shuvinai Ashoona
 Siasi Atitu
 Alootook Ipellie
 Osuitok Ipeelee
 Josephina Kalleo
 Helen Kalvak
 Simeonie Keenainak
 Siassie Kenneally
 Ruben Komangapik
 Floyd Kuptana
 Andy Miki
 Annie Niviaxie
 Jessie Oonark
 John Pangnark
 Parr
 David Ruben Piqtoukun
 Peter Pitseolak
 Timootee (Tim) Pitsiulak
 Annie Pootoogook
 Kananginak Pootoogook
 Pudlo Pudlat
 Andrew Qappik
 Lissie Saggiak
 Pauta Saila
 Nick Sikkuark
 Joe Talirunili
 Tanya Tagaq
 Ningiukulu Teevee
 Irene Avaalaaqiaq Tiktaalaaq
 John Tiktak
 Simon Tookoome
 Ovilu Tunnillie
 Marion Tuu'luq
 Natar Ungalaaq

See also
 Alaska Native art
 Arctic Experience McNaught Gallery
 Art Gallery of Ontario
 North America Native Museum
Inukshuk
List of Inuit
 List of indigenous artists of the Americas
 List of Greenlandic artists
 Visual arts by indigenous peoples of the Americas

Sources

References

 
 

 
 
 Blodgett, Jean (1991). In Cape Dorset We Do It This Way: Three Decades of Inuit Printmaking. Ontario: McMichael.

External links

 The Canadian Museum of Civilization – Historic Inuit Art
 Gallery of Dorset culture art from the Canadian Museum of Civilization
 Inuit Artists Print Database, National Gallery of Canada
 Ulluriat, online showcase of Inuit art, National Gallery of Canada
 Ron Gould fonds at the National Gallery of Canada
 Inuit Art Society, an organization of collectors and enthusiasts
 
 Watch The Living Stone and Eskimo Artist: Kenojuak online
 Central Arctic collections , National Museum of the American Indian
 Eastern Arctic collections , National Museum of the American Indian
 Greenlandic collections , National Museum of the American Indian
 Native paths: American Indian art from the collection of Charles and Valerie Diker, an exhibition catalog from The Metropolitan Museum of Art (fully available online as PDF), which contains material on and examples of Inuit art
 Symbols of Authenticity: Challenging the Static Imposition of Minority Identities through the Case Study of Contemporary Inuit Art 

 
Canadian culture
Canadian art
Indigenous art in Canada
Indigenous art of the Americas